The Augsburger Panther are a professional ice hockey team in the Deutsche Eishockey Liga. The team is based in Augsburg, Bavaria, Germany. They play their home games at the Curt Frenzel Stadion.

Founded in 1878, the team's name was Augsburger EV (Augsburger Eislaufverein, i.e. "Augsburgian Skating Society") until 1994, when it was changed to Augsburger Panther.

Season records

Players

Current roster

Notable alumni
Dennis Endras – First German Player who was voted for MVP at IIHF World Championships 2010
Duanne Moeser – The club's all-time scoring leader, he played 15 years in Augsburg and since 2005/2006 he has been working in the club's management
Ernst Höfner – 3x Bundesliga champion and currently assistant head coach of the German National Hockey Team
Glenn Anderson – Represented Canada at the 1980 Olympics, twice at the World Championships, the Canada Cup, and won six Stanley Cups
Paul Ambros – 11x Bundesliga champion
Udo Kießling – 6x Bundesliga champion and member of the IIHF-Hockey Hall of Fame
Xaver Unsinn – 8x Bundesliga champion and former head coach of the German National Hockey Team

References

External links
 

Sport in Augsburg
Deutsche Eishockey Liga teams
Ice hockey teams in Bavaria
Ice hockey clubs established in 1878
1878 establishments in Germany